Apex Medical is a multinational corporation specializing in medical treatments including therapeutic support surface, respiratory therapy (CPAP & respiratory mask, nebulizer, suction machine), sterilization equipment, intermittent pneumatic compression devices, total bed solution and other medical treatments & services. Its products & services have been implemented in hospitals, nursing & rehabilitation facilities, health agencies, and home-care channels in over 70 countries worldwide.

History and acquisitions 

Apex Medical was established in 1990 and focuses on the manufacturing of wound management equipment, respiratory therapy, and digital healthcare services for patients and healthcare providers. That same year, Apex medical set up a sales channel and services center in Taiwan. Apex Medical (Kunshan) Co., Ltd. was founded in 2000 as a manufacturing site in China. As the major part of productivity shifted to China, Taiwan's headquarters became more of a research & development center. 

2001 – reinvested Apex Medical USA CORP. As the sales and service center in the USA.

2002 – cooperated with Industrial Technology Research Institute (ITRI) of Taiwan, starting development of respiratory therapy product series.

2004 – initial public offering in TWSE. In the same year established Apex Medical S.L. in Spain, conducting sales and marketing activities across Europe.

2006 – Apex expanded its sales territory to EMEA, Southeast Asia and Greater China.

2011 – Apex Medical merged and acquired Sturdy Industrial Co. Ltd to expand the product portfolio in the aspect of sterilization solution.

2012 – acquired a majority stake of Westmeria Healthcare Ltd., a UK company which mainly focuses on rental business of wound management solution and has a wide range of service network across the British Isles.

2015 – acquired full ownership of Westmeria, combining strengths and advantages of both companies' product lines to deliver a more complete solution to customers.

2016 – acquired 50% ownership of SLK Vertriebs GmbH and SLK Medical GmbH, bringing intermittent pneumatic compression devices into Apex's product portfolio. In the same year Apex Medical entered the Latin America market.

2017 – acquired Nexus DMS Ltd in UK. The cooperation enriched the company's medical bed portfolio, enabling Apex to offer total bed solution and value-added healthcare services in the UK. 

2019 – launched a new series of respiratory mask and low air loss mattress system.

2020 – fully acquired SLK Vertriebs GmbH and SLK Medical GmbH.

See also 

 Alivecor
 NxStage
 Vacuactivus

References 

Taiwanese brands
Taiwanese companies established in 1989
Multinational companies headquartered in Taiwan
Medical device manufacturers